Pablo Santos González (born 15 June 1984, in Granada, Spain) is a Spanish professional tennis player.  He has won three ATP Challenger titles, all in doubles.

ATP Tournaments Finals

Runner-Up (1)

Notes

References

External links
 
 

Living people
Spanish male tennis players
Sportspeople from Granada
1984 births
Tennis players from Andalusia